The 2002 Canadian Senior Curling Championships were held February 2 to 10 at the St. Thomas Curling Club in St. Thomas, Ontario.

Men's

Teams

Standings

Results

Draw 1

Draw 2

Draw 3

Draw 4

Draw 5

Draw 6

Draw 7

Draw 8

Draw 9

Draw 10

Draw 11

Draw 13

Draw 15

Draw 17

Draw 19

Draw 21

Playoffs

Semifinal

Final

Women's

Teams

Standings

Results

Draw 1

Draw 2

Draw 3

Draw 4

Draw 5

Draw 6

Draw 7

Draw 8

Draw 9

Draw 10

Draw 12

Draw 14

Draw 16

Draw 18

Draw 20

Draw 22

Playoffs

Semifinal

Final

External links
Men's statistics
Women's statistics

References
 

2002 in Canadian curling
Canadian Senior Curling Championships
Curling in Ontario
2002 in Ontario
St. Thomas, Ontario
February 2002 sports events in North America